Senator Leavitt may refer to:

Dixie L. Leavitt (born 1929), Utah State Senate
Humphrey H. Leavitt (1796–1873), Ohio State Senate
John Hooker Leavitt (1831–1906), Iowa State Senate
Jonathan Leavitt (1764–1830), Massachusetts State Senate
Roger Hooker Leavitt (1805–1885), Massachusetts State Senate